Maison de Victor Hugo is a writer's house museum located where Victor Hugo lived for 16 years between 1832 and 1848. It is one of the 14 City of Paris' Museums that have been incorporated since January 1, 2013 in the public institution Paris Musées.

History
The museum is in the Place des Vosges (3rd and 4th arrondissement of Paris) and dates from 1605 when a lot was granted to Isaac Arnauld in the south-east corner of the square. It was substantially improved by the de Rohans family, who gave the building its current name of Hôtel de Rohan-Guéménée. Victor Hugo was 30 when he moved into the house in October 1832 with his wife Adèle. They rented a 280 square metre apartment on the second floor. The mansion was converted into a museum when a large donation was made by Paul Meurice to the city of Paris to buy the house.

The museum consists of an antechamber leading through the Chinese living room and medieval style dining room to Victor Hugo's bedroom where he died in 1885.

Victor Hugo's House also manages the Hauteville House, in Guernsey, (Channel Islands).

Access and opening times
The parisian museum, at 6, Place des Vosges is within easy walking distance of three Paris Metro stations :
 Saint-Paul
 Chemin-Vert
 Bastille
Opening times are from Tuesday to Sunday from 10am to 6pm. It is closed on Mondays and public holidays. 
Phone numbers for the museum are 00 33 (1) 42 72 10 16 and for fax 00 33 (1) 42 72 06 64

See also 
 List of museums in Paris

References

External links 
 Victor Hugo's Houses webpages on paris.fr (French)
 Victor Hugo's Houses page on Paris Musées' website (English)
  (English)
 Gives a history of 6, Place des Vosges

Biographical museums in France
Buildings and structures in the 4th arrondissement of Paris
Historic house museums in Paris
Houses in Paris
Literary museums in France
Paris Musées